Round Lake is a lake in Berrien County, in the U.S. state of Michigan.

Round Lake was so named on account of the shape of its outline.

References

Lakes of Berrien County, Michigan